
Straight No Chaser may refer to:

Music

Songs 
 "Straight, No Chaser" (composition), 1951, by jazz musician Thelonious Monk
 "Straight No Chaser", a song by Bush from the album Razorblade Suitcase

Albums 
 Straight, No Chaser (Thelonious Monk album), 1967
 Straight, No Chaser (Joe Henderson album), 1968
 Straight No Chaser (Mr Hudson album), 2009
 Straight, No Chaser (Reks album) and its title track, 2012

Groups 
 Straight No Chaser (group), an American a cappella group
 Straight No Chaser, former name of the college a cappella group Another Round

Other media 
 Straight No Chaser (magazine), a British music magazine
 Thelonious Monk: Straight, No Chaser, a 1988 documentary film

Other uses 
 A combination of two common bartending terms

See also
 Straight No Chase, a 1998 album by Dungeon Family associates P.A.